Kathleen Gati (born 13 August 1957) is a US-based Canadian actress. She is known for portraying Liesl Obrecht on the ABC daytime soap opera General Hospital. She appeared on the television series Leverage in 2009.

Career
At the age of 20, she moved to New York, and began acting in off-Broadway productions, and well as ABC daytime soap opera All My Children over 1989 to 1990. In the early 1990s, Gati moved to Hungary for a film role (Sose halunk meg) and stayed there for five years before returning in the United States.

Gati has appeared in a number of movies, including Sunshine (1999), Igby Goes Down (2002), Meet the Fockers (2004), and The Future (2011). On television, she has had guest starring roles on The Practice, NYPD Blue, ER, Cold Case Desperate Housewives, NCIS, The Mentalist, and Arrow. She also had the recurring role as Russian First Lady Anya Suvarov on Fox series 24 from 2006 to 2007.

In 2012, Gati joined the cast of ABC daytime soap opera General Hospital playing the villainous Dr. Liesl Obrecht. In 2015, she had a recurring role in the BET drama series Being Mary Jane, playing network executive Shohreh Broomand, and during 2015-16 had a starring role in the web series Fear the Walking Dead: Flight 462.

In 2015, Gati portrayed Valentina Winterthorne on the soap opera web series Winterthorne. In 2016, she was nominated for an Indie Series Award for Best Guest Actress in a Drama, and a Daytime Emmy Award for Outstanding Actress in a Digital Daytime Drama Series for the role.

Filmography

Film

Television

Videogames

Awards and nominations
 Won the Film Critics Award at the Hungarian Film Critics Awards in 1993 for Best Supporting Actress for Goldberg variácók (1992)
 Won the Best Actress Award at the Los Angeles Hungarian Film Festival in 2011 for Visszatérés-Retrace (2011)
 Won the Best Documentary award at the Hungarian Film Week in 1995 for A Színésznõ és a halál (1993) shared with Gábor Dettre
 Nominated for a Daytime Emmy Award for Outstanding Actress in a Digital Daytime Drama Series for Winterthorne (2016).
 Nominated for an Indie Series Award for Best Guest Actress in a Drama for Winterthorne (2016)

Personal life
Gati is the daughter of Laszlo and Agnes Gati; Hungarian immigrants to Canada, a symphony conductor and an opera singer. She married Michael Browers on 7 April 2012.

References

External links
 
 

1957 births
Living people
Actresses from Montreal
Anglophone Quebec people
Canadian film actresses
Canadian people of Hungarian descent
Canadian soap opera actresses
Canadian television actresses